Lesotho requires its residents to register their motor vehicles and display vehicle registration plates.

Plates are blue-on-white for private vehicles and red-on-white for government vehicles.  They follow the format of one or two letters followed by four numbers.  Diplomatic Plates are blue-on-white however have the letters CD on them.

A mokorotlo, the same colour as the characters on the plate, is stuck onto the plate to show a 5-year validity period.

Dealer plates are also red-on-white but do not follow the A 1234 standard and do not show the mokorotlo.

Before 1979, private plates were white-on-black and had an additional preceding 'L' which stood for Lesotho.

Kingdom of Lesotho 
Period following independence:
LA – Maseru
LB – Butha Buthe
LC – Leribe
LD – Teyateyaneng
LE – Mafeteng
LF – Mohales Hoek
LG – Quthing
LH – Qacha's Nek
LJ – Mokhotlong
Government:
LX – Government vehicles
Diplomatic corps:
Owing to a dispute between the foreign legations, several of them used distinctive codes for a period:
UKHC – United Kingdom High Commission
UNDP – United Nations Development Programme
USA – United States of America
WHO – World Health Organisation
ROC – Republic of China (Taiwan)
D – Federal Republic of Germany (West Germany)
The rest of the legations used DC.

Colony of Basutoland 
Prior to independence:
BA – Maseru
BB – Butha Buthe
BC – Leribe
BD – Teyateyaneng
BE – Mafeteng
BF – Mohales Hoek
BG – Quthing
BH – Qacha's Nek
BJ – Mokhotlong
Government:
BX – Government vehicles

References
World License Plates
Holcroft's South African Calendar 1975, published by Vergne, Pretoria (for earlier codes).

External links

Lesotho
Transport in Lesotho
Lesotho transport-related lists